Babagil is a village in the Lerik Rayon of Azerbaijan. The village forms part of the municipality of Günəşli. The village contains an 18th-century tomb that is registered with the Ministry of Culture and Tourism.

References 

Populated places in Lerik District